Chausses were a Medieval term for leggings, which was also used for leg armour; routinely made of mail and referred to as mail chausses. They generally extended well-above the knee, covering most of the leg. Mail Chausses were the standard type of metal leg armour in Europe from the 11th to the 14th century. Chausses offered flexible protection that was effective against slashing weapons. However, the wearer still felt the full force of crushing blows.

One of the first depictions of mail chausses is in the Bayeux tapestry of 1066–1083, with William the Conqueror and several other Normans wearing them. The vast majority of the Norman troops used no leg armour at all in the Battle of Hastings in 1066. Chausses became more common as the 12th century progressed and by 1200 nearly all knights and men-at-arms were outfitted with them. From about 1200 onward, padded, quilted breeches would be worn over the upper leg mail chausse. This type of armour was known as the gamboised cuisse.

Reinforcing plates for knees called poleyns began to supplement mail chausses after about 1230. Because most leg armor had to be pulled on from the foot, rather than snapped on such as a breastplate, a chausse might have been considered to be worn on the foot. Steel shin plates called schynbalds came into use during the mid-13th century. Unlike greaves, schynbalds protected only the front of the lower leg. These early plate additions were worn over chausses and held in place with leather straps. Chausses became obsolete in the 14th century as plate armour developed.

Chausses were also worn as a woollen legging with layers, as part of civilian dress, and as a gamboissed (padded) garment for chain mail.

The old French word chausse, meaning stocking, survives only in modern French as the stem of the words chaussure (shoe) and chaussette (sock) and in the tongue-twister:

which today is often misunderstood as "les chaussettes de l’archiduchesse".
In addition, among some Catholic monastic nuns, the special stocking/leggings worn were called chausses.

Citations

References

External links 
 Arador Armour Library guide to constructing replica chausses
 A General History of Armor

13th-century fashion
14th-century fashion
Medieval armour
Western plate armour